Howrah Dakshin Assembly constituency is an assembly constituency in Howrah district in the Indian state of West Bengal.

Overview
As per orders of the Delimitation Commission, No. 173 Howrah Dakshin Assembly constituency is composed of the following: Ward Nos. 35, 38 to 41 and 44 to 46 of Howrah Municipal Corporation and Duila, Jorhat, Panchpara and Thanamakua gram panchayats of Sankrail community development block.

Howrah South Assembly constituency is part of No. 25 Howrah (Lok Sabha constituency).

Members of Legislative Assembly

Election results

2021

2016

2011

 

.# Trinamool Congress did not contest this seat in 2006.

1977-2006
In the 2006 state assembly elections, Krishna Kisor Ray of CPI(M) won 164 Howrah South assembly seat defeating his nearest rival Amitava Dutta of JD(U). Contests in most years were multi cornered but only winners and runners are being mentioned. Badal Basu of CPI(M) defeated Arup Ray of Trinamool Congress in 2001. Pralay Talukdar of CPI(M) defeated Arup Roy of Congress in 1996 and Mrityunjoy Banerjee of Congress in 1991. Mrityunjoy Banerjee of Congress defeated Pralay Talukdar of CPI(M) in 1987. Pralay Talukdar of CPI(M) defeated Amiya Kumar Dutta of Congress in 1982 and Ambica Banerjee of Congress in 1977.

1951-1972
Santi Kumar Dasgupta of Congress won in 1972 and 1971. Pralay Talukdar of CPI(M) won in 1969. B.K.Bhattacharya of Congress won in 1967. Kanai Lal Bhattacharya of Forward Bloc won in 1962 and 1957. Beni Charan Dutta of Congress won in 1951.

References

Assembly constituencies of West Bengal
Politics of Howrah district
1952 establishments in West Bengal
Constituencies established in 1952